Acacia gordonii is a shrub belonging to the genus Acacia and the subgenus Phyllodineae that is native to parts of eastern Australia.

It blooms between August and September and produces yellow flowers.

The shrub is found in New South Wales that is found between Bilpin in the north to Faulconbridge in the south in the foothills of the Blue Mountains where it is found on ridges and hill tops growing in sandstone based soils as a part of dry sclerophyll forest communities.

See also
 List of Acacia' species

References

gordonii
Flora of New South Wales
Taxa named by Leslie Pedley